Thomas Marten may refer to:

Thomas Marten (British Army officer) (1797–1868), British lieutenant-general
J. Thomas Marten (born 1951), United States federal judge

See also
Thomas Martin (disambiguation)
Thomas Martyn (disambiguation)